Şükran Moral (born in 1962 In Terme, Samsun) is a Turkish artist, best known for her performances, videos and installations. During the 80's and 90's, she wrote poetry and worked as a journalist and art critic in Turkey. Moral currently lives and works in Istanbul and Rome.

Early years 

Şükran Moral was born in 1962 in Terme, Samsun. She has three brothers and one sister. Her father refused to allow Moral to attend  middle school, insisting that she work in tailors shop.  However, with her mother's help, she  secretly attended started middle school. Moral graduated from high school despite have to deal with domestic violence and peer pressure.

Moral graduated from the Department of Fine Arts in the Faculty of Education at Ankara University. In 1989, she moved to Italy and studied again at the Accademia di Belle Arti di Roma, where she graduated from the painting section in 1995.

Artistic career 

Moral's area of interest have mostly been the negative effects of religion on women, the mentally ill and disordered and the alienation and exclusion of immigrants, Transsexuals, and Prostitutes.

In 1997, she made a performance at the Museum of Contemporary Art Workshop Sapienza University of Rome, with the title "Museum & Morgue", where she transformed the museum into a morgue. She has performed works at a women's asylum in Istanbul.

One of her most famous works was "Hamam", performed in the men's section of a Turkish bath in Galatasaray, Istanbul.  It was exhibited in 1997 as a part of the International Istanbul Biennial. "What's scandalous here is not the nudity," she says, "What's scandalous was the fact that here I was, an intellectual woman, who proposes doing something scandalous. If I had really been a whore, it would have been no big deal. Just being a female avant-garde artist is scandalous."

In Press 

In 2005, a book about Moral's work, titled Apocalypse, was published by the Italian publisher Gangemi, curated by Simonetta Lux and Patrizia Mania.

References

External links 
 Official website
 http://www.sukranmoral.net/ 
 Interview with Inside Art Webtv (in Italian)
 Şukran Moral on turkishculture.com
 Şükran Moral on eskizozluk.com
 Şükran Moral sahnede sevişti - izle
 Şukran Moral on artfacts.net

1962 births
Living people
Turkish contemporary artists
20th-century Turkish women artists
21st-century Turkish women artists
People from Terme